Dejounte Dashaun Murray (born September 19, 1996) is an American professional basketball player for the Atlanta Hawks of the National Basketball Association (NBA). He played one season of college basketball for the Washington Huskies, where he earned second-team all-conference honors in the Pac-12 as a freshman in 2015–16. He was selected by the San Antonio Spurs in the first round of the 2016 NBA draft with the 29th overall pick. In 2022, Murray was named to his first NBA All-Star Game and led the league in steals. He is the Spurs' franchise leader in career triple-doubles.

High school career
Murray attended Rainier Beach High School in Seattle, Washington. The school is a basketball powerhouse, having produced such NBA talents as Jamal Crawford, Doug Christie, Terrence Williams, Nate Robinson and Kevin Porter Jr. Murray led the Vikings to three Class 3A state championships titles. Among other honors that he received, Murray was named Washington Mr. Basketball by the Washington Interscholastic Basketball Coaches Association as well as The Seattle Times State Player of the Year.

College career
As a freshman at the University of Washington in 2015–16, Murray was named second-team All-Pac-12 and Pac-12 All-Freshman Team after averaging 16.1 points, 5.9 rebounds, 4.4 assists and 1.8 steals in 33.5 minutes while starting all 34 games.

On March 23, 2016, Murray declared for the NBA draft, forgoing his final three years of college eligibility.

Professional career

San Antonio Spurs (2016–2022)
On June 23, 2016, Murray was selected by the San Antonio Spurs with the 29th overall pick in the 2016 NBA draft. He joined the Spurs for the 2016 NBA Summer League, and on July 14, he signed his rookie scale contract with the team. On October 29, 2016, in the Spurs' third game of the 2016–17 season, Murray made his NBA debut. In just under nine minutes off the bench, he recorded two rebounds and one assist in a 98–79 win over the New Orleans Pelicans. On January 12, 2017, he scored a season-high 10 points in a 134–94 win over the Los Angeles Lakers. He surpassed that mark on January 19, scoring 24 points in a 118–104 win over the Denver Nuggets. During his rookie season, he had multiple assignments with the Austin Spurs of the NBA Development League.

On May 5, 2017, with Tony Parker ruled out for the rest of the playoffs with a leg injury, the Spurs opted to start Murray at point guard in Game 3 of their second-round series against the Houston Rockets. He scored two points in 15 minutes, as the Spurs took a 2–1 lead in the series with a 103–92 win. He helped the Spurs clinch the series against the Rockets with 11 points, 10 rebounds and 5 assists in a Game 6 win. He became just the fourth rookie in Spurs history to record a point/rebound double-double in a playoff game, joining David Robinson, Tim Duncan, and Kawhi Leonard. The Spurs went on to lose to the Golden State Warriors in the Western Conference Finals.

In the Spurs' season opener on October 18, 2017, Murray had 16 points, five rebounds, and two assists while starting in place of Parker in a 107–99 win over the Minnesota Timberwolves. On December 9, 2017, he tied his career-high with 14 rebounds in a 104–101 win over the Phoenix Suns. On February 3, 2018, in a 120–111 loss to the Utah Jazz, Murray became the first player since Kawhi Leonard with 500 points and 300 rebounds in his first 100 games with the Spurs. On March 19, 2018, in an 89–75 win over the Warriors, Murray had eight rebounds to set the franchise record for rebounds in a single season by a point guard. Murray reached 385 rebounds in 1,436 minutes, surpassing Johnny Moore's total of 378 collected in 2,689 minutes. In Game 4 of the Spurs' first-round playoff series against the Warriors, Murray was 3-for-3 on 3-pointers in the first half, the most three-pointers made in the playoffs without a miss by a Spurs player since Steve Kerr (2003) and Patty Mills (2014) were 4-for-4 in a half. At the season's end, he earned NBA All-Defensive Second Team honors, becoming the youngest player in NBA history to be named All-Defense.

On October 7, 2018, Murray suffered a torn right anterior cruciate ligament injury in a preseason game against the Rockets. He subsequently missed the entire 2018–19 season. In October 2019, the Spurs and Murray agreed to a $64 million, four-year contract, taking the contract to $70 million with incentives. On December 26, 2020, Murray recorded his first career triple-double with 11 points, 10 rebounds and 10 assists in the Spurs' 119–114 win against the Toronto Raptors. On February 8, 2021, he recorded 27 points, 10 rebounds, and a career-high eight steals in the Spurs' 105–100 win against the Warriors.

On February 7, 2022, Murray was named to his first NBA All-Star team as an injury replacement for Draymond Green. On February 13, in a 124–114 win over the Pelicans, Murray became the first player in NBA history to record at least 30 points, 10 rebounds, and no more than one turnover in consecutive games since individual turnovers were first tracked in 1977–78. He finished second, behind Ja Morant, in voting for the Most Improved Player award. Murray finished the 2022 season as the first player in NBA history to average 20 points, 8 rebounds, 9 assists and 2 steals a game.

Atlanta Hawks (2022–present)
On June 30, 2022, Murray was traded, alongside Jock Landale, to the Atlanta Hawks in exchange for Danilo Gallinari and multiple future first-round picks.  On October 19, Murray made his Hawks debut, putting up 20 points, 11 assists, five rebounds, and five steals in a 117–107 win over the Houston Rockets. On November 2, Murray recorded a then-career-high 36 points, along with 4 rebounds, 9 assists, and 6 steals in a 112–99 win against the New York Knicks. On November 5, Murray recorded his first career triple-double with the Hawks, putting up 22 points, 10 rebounds, 11 assists, and 3 steals in a 124–121 overtime win against the New Orleans Pelicans. On November 25, Murray recorded a then career-high 39 points on eight three-pointers made in a 122–128 loss against the Houston Rockets. 

On January 20, 2023, Murray led the Hawks to a 129–124 win over the New York Knicks with 29 points and a season-high 12 assists. On January 30, Murray scored a then career-high 40 points, along with eight rebounds, seven assists, two steals and zero turnovers in a 125–129 loss against the Portland Trail Blazers. On March 3, Murray scored a career-high 41 points on 17-of-22 shooting, 5-of-5 from three, 2-of-2 from the free throw line in a 129–111 win over the Portland Trail Blazers.

Career statistics

NBA

Regular season

|-
| style="text-align:left;"|
| style="text-align:left;"|San Antonio
| 38 || 8 || 8.5 || .431 || .391 || .700 || 1.1 || 1.3 || .2 || .2 || 3.4
|-
| style="text-align:left;"|
| style="text-align:left;"|San Antonio
| 81 || 48 || 21.5 || .443 || .265 || .709 || 5.7 || 2.9 || 1.2 || .4 || 8.1
|-
| style="text-align:left;"|
| style="text-align:left;"|San Antonio
| 66 || 58 || 25.6 || .462 || .369 || .798 || 5.8 || 4.1 || 1.7 || .3 || 10.9
|-
| style="text-align:left;"|
| style="text-align:left;"|San Antonio
| 67 || 67 || 31.9 || .453 || .317 || .791 || 7.1 || 5.4 || 1.5 || .1 || 15.7
|-
| style="text-align:left;"|
| style="text-align:left;"|San Antonio
| 68 || 68 || 34.8 || .462 || .327 || .794 || 8.3 || 9.2 || style="background:#cfecec;"|2.0* || .3 || 21.1
|- class="sortbottom"
| colspan=2 style="text-align:center"|Career
| 320 || 249 || 25.8 || .456 || .340 || .771 || 6.0 || 4.8 || 1.4 || .3 || 12.5
|- class="sortbottom"
| style="text-align:center;" colspan="2"|All-Star
| 1 || 0 || 27.0 || .636 || .333 || 1.000 || 5.0 || 5.0 || .0 || 1.0 || 17.0

Playoffs

|-
| style="text-align:left;"|2017
| style="text-align:left;"|San Antonio
| 11 || 2 || 15.3 || .377 || .000 || .680 || 2.5 || 2.5 || 1.5 || .1 || 5.7
|-
| style="text-align:left;"|2018
| style="text-align:left;"|San Antonio
| 5 || 5 || 19.2 || .452 || .667 || .778 || 4.2 || 1.8 || 1.0 || .4 || 7.8
|- class="sortbottom"
| colspan=2 style="text-align:center"|Career
| 16 || 7 || 16.5 || .402 || .444 || .706 || 3.0 || 2.3 || 1.3 || .2 || 6.4

College

|-
| style="text-align:left;"|2015–16
| style="text-align:left;"|Washington
| 34 || 34 || 33.5 || .416 || .288 || .663 || 6.0 || 4.4 || 1.8 || .3 || 16.1

References

External links

 Washington Huskies bio

1996 births
Living people
21st-century African-American sportspeople
African-American basketball players
American men's basketball players
Atlanta Hawks players
Austin Spurs players
Basketball players from Seattle
Point guards
Parade High School All-Americans (boys' basketball)
San Antonio Spurs draft picks
San Antonio Spurs players
Washington Huskies men's basketball players